Pillsbury Tower is a remnant volcanic cone, 1,295 m, with a sheer north-facing rock cliff and a gradual slope at the south side, standing directly at the base of Avalanche Ridge in the Jones Mountains. With its dark rock rising 100 m above the surrounding area, it is clearly the most prominent landmark in these mountains. Mapped by the University of Minnesota-Jones Mountains Party, 1960–61, and named by them after Pillsbury Hall which houses the Dept. of Geology at the University of Minnesota.

References

Volcanoes of Ellsworth Land